Murata Boy and Murata Girl are two self-balancing robots developed by Murata Manufacturing, a Japanese electronic components company. The company developed the robots to showcase a range of their products and generate publicity. The robots are designed to be as energy-efficient as possible, both in their basic technological components and through features like automatic sleep mode.

Murata Boy
Murata Boy is a bicycle-riding robot which, standing 50 cm tall and weighing 5 kg, can travel at a speed up to 2 km per hour. It can balance on the bike moving forwards, backwards, and when remaining still (without planting his feet on the ground). The robot is equipped with:
 gyro sensors (for stability and redressing)
 a shock sensor (for impact detection)
 an angular velocity sensor
 a temperature monitor
 a CCD camera
 an ultrasonic sensor (for obstacle detection)
 an infrared sensor (for detecting human movement)
 an EMI filter (to reduce electronic interference)
 Wi-Fi and energy-efficient close-distance bluetooth modules (for interaction)
Murata Boy was listed on TIME magazine's list of Best Inventions of 2006.

Murata Girl
Murata Girl is a unicycle-riding robot released in 2008, standing 50 cm tall and weighing 6 kg that can travel at a speed of 5 cm per second and can ride along a balance beam. She is equipped with the following:
 gyro sensors (for stability and redressing)
 a shock sensor (for impact detection)
 a temperature monitor
 a CCD camera
 an ultrasonic sensor (for obstacle detection)
 an infrared sensor (for detecting human movement)
 Wi-Fi and energy-efficient close-distance bluetooth modules

References

Best Balance Bike

External links
 Description page on Murata's official website

2005 robots
Humanoid robots
Robotics in Japan
Best Balance Bike